45th Street is a proposed Tri-Rail Coastal Link Green Line station in West Palm Beach, Florida. The station is planned for construction at 45th Street between Greenwood Avenue and Pinewood Avenue, just west Broadway (US 1).

References

External links
 Proposed site in Google Maps Street View

West Palm Beach, Florida
Tri-Rail stations in Palm Beach County, Florida
Proposed Tri-Rail stations